Lu Jui-Chiung (born 25 February 1964) is a Taiwanese archer.

Archery

Lu competed in the 1984 Summer Olympic Games. She came 42nd with 2226 points scored in the women's individual event.

References

External links 
 Profile on worldarchery.org

1964 births
Living people
Taiwanese female archers
Olympic archers of Taiwan
Archers at the 1984 Summer Olympics